Alain Sign (born 3 February 1986) is a British sailor. He and Dylan Fletcher placed sixth in the 49er event at the 2016 Summer Olympics.

References

External links
 
 
 
 

1986 births
Living people
British male sailors (sport)
Olympic sailors of Great Britain
Sailors at the 2016 Summer Olympics – 49er
29er class world champions
World champions in sailing for Great Britain